Norfolk Southern Tower is one of the major distinctive and recognizable features of Downtown Norfolk, Virginia, United States. The building is notable as being the corporate headquarters of one of the United States' five Class I railroads, Norfolk Southern.  The tower was completed in 1989 at the corner of Main Street and Commercial Place in the business district of Downtown Norfolk.

Norfolk Southern Museum
The first floor of the tower features the free Norfolk Southern Museum detailing the history of Norfolk Southern, which was created from numerous mergers over the last two centuries. Displays include photos, brochures, sections of Civil War-era track, vintage hand tools, a locomotive simulator, luggage tags, and diagrams to teach hand signals to railroad trainees and a 900-pound railroad coupler.

See also 
List of tallest buildings in Norfolk, Virginia

References

External links
 Norfolk Southern Museum

Buildings and structures in Norfolk, Virginia
Office buildings completed in 1989
Norfolk Southern Railway
Skyscraper office buildings in Norfolk, Virginia
Downtown Norfolk, Virginia
1989 establishments in Virginia